Gamma-adducin is a protein that in humans is encoded by the ADD3 gene.

Adducins are heteromeric proteins composed of different subunits referred to as adducin alpha, beta and gamma. The three subunits are encoded by distinct genes and belong to a family of membrane skeletal proteins involved in the assembly of spectrin-actin network in erythrocytes and at sites of cell-cell contact in epithelial tissues. While adducins alpha and gamma are ubiquitously expressed, the expression of adducin beta is restricted to brain and hematopoietic tissues. Adducin, originally purified from human erythrocytes, was found to be a heterodimer of adducins alpha and beta. Polymorphisms resulting in amino acid substitutions in these two subunits have been associated with the regulation of blood pressure in an animal model of hypertension. Heterodimers consisting of alpha and gamma subunits have also been described. Structurally, each subunit is composed of two distinct domains. The amino-terminal region is protease-resistant and globular in shape, while the carboxy-terminal region is protease-sensitive. The latter contains multiple phosphorylation sites for protein kinase C, the binding site for calmodulin, and is required for association with spectrin and actin. Alternatively spliced adducin gamma transcripts encoding different isoforms have been described. The functions of the different isoforms are not known.

References

External links

Further reading